Janusz Gancarczyk (born 19 June 1984) is a Polish professional footballer who plays as a midfielder for Moto Jelcz Oława.

Career

Club
In the past he was a player of MKS Oława, Górnik Polkowice and Śląsk Wrocław.

In January 2010, he joined Polonia Warsaw.

In July 2011, he joined Zagłębie Lubin on a free transfer and signed a three-year contract.

International
Gancarczyk once performed in Polish national team. He played last 21 minutes in a friendly against Canada (18 November 2009).

Family
His brothers Marek, Waldemar, Mateusz and Krzysztof are also all footballers.

References

External links
 
 

1984 births
People from Oława
Sportspeople from Lower Silesian Voivodeship
Living people
Polish footballers
Poland international footballers
Association football midfielders
Górnik Polkowice players
Śląsk Wrocław players
Polonia Warsaw players
Zagłębie Lubin players
GKS Katowice players
Odra Opole players
Kotwica Kołobrzeg footballers
Ekstraklasa players
I liga players
II liga players
III liga players